Where Angels Fear to Tread is the third studio album by Mentallo & The Fixer, released on May 16, 1994, by Zoth Ommog Records. It is considered a favorite of the band's critics and audience.

Music
Where Angels Fear to Tread integrated gothic music into its sound, making its compositions sound more melancholy in contrast to the abrasive sound of the band's previous work. The album's music also made extensive use of you use of science fiction and horror film samples.

The album was re-released by Metropolis Records on July 18, 1995, without additional content. In 2014, the album was issued as a music download by Alfa Matrix. The entire album was remastered and released as part of the Zothera box set on December 2, 2014.

Reception

Theo Kavadias of AllMusic says the "progression in this third release points to a more refined and polished electronic sound that sacrifices none of the dark intensity or raw power established in previous releases." The critic went on to say "there is more to Where Angels Fear to Tread than smoother synth voices playing out the complex, pulsing melodies and layered compositions for which Mentallo & the Fixer have become known" and "doomy, tortured vocals have found slightly different tones throughout the release, and tracks such as "Virtually Hopeless," "Sacrilege," and "Decomposed (Trampled)," seem to be reaching in new directions, achieving a new and smoother tone, with ethereal highlights and a more even pace." Sonic Boom said "It's not often that you find a band with such an astute sense of direction coupled with a cohesive album concept and musical style." Peek-A-Boo Magazine noted the song "Sacrilege" as being a shining example of the band's craft and said "other excellent tracks that combine pulsing beats, melancholic synths and  percussion are Decomposed, Abominations unleashed, Ruthless (with samples from Blade Runner) and Afterglow."

Track listing

Personnel
Adapted from the Where Angels Fear to Tread liner notes.

Mentallo & The Fixer
 Dwayne Dassing (as The Fixer) – programming, cover art, illustrations
 Gary Dassing (as Mentallo) – programming, cover art, illustrations

Production and design
 Hype Graphics (as hype graphics/Berlin) – cover, design

Release history

References

External links 
 
 Where Angels Fear to Tread at Bandcamp
 Where Angels Fear to Tread at iTunes

1994 albums
Mentallo & The Fixer albums
Metropolis Records albums
Zoth Ommog Records albums